The zebra goby (Zebrus zebrus) is a species of goby native to the Mediterranean Sea, where it occurs in lagoons and tide pools at depths down to . It prefers areas of concealment, such as within patches of seagrass or algae or underneath stones. This species is the only known member of its genus.

References

Gobiinae
Monotypic fish genera
Fish described in 1827